Xisco is the nickname of people named Francisco. Notable people with the nickname include:

Xisco (footballer, born 1980), Spanish footballer
Xisco (footballer, born 1986), Spanish footballer
Xisco Nadal (born 1986), Spanish footballer
Xisco Pires (born 1998), Andorran footballer